The 2019–20 season is the Melbourne Victory Women's twelfth season in the W-League, and twelfth in top flight Australian women's soccer. The club is participating in the A-League and the AFC Women's Club Championship.

Players

Transfers

Transfers in

Transfers out

W-League

League table

Fixtures

Finals Series

References

External links
 Melbourne Victory official website

Melbourne Victory FC (A-League Women) seasons